Edward Charles Richards (born 29 August 1965) is a Managing Partner at Flint business advisory, and previously was the Chief Executive of Ofcom, the independent regulator for the communications industry in the United Kingdom. He stepped down in December 2014.

Richards attended the Portsmouth Grammar School, where he overlapped with Mel Stride, who is now a Conservative MP for Central Devon. He graduated from the London School of Economics with an Economics degree.

Richards was previously a Senior Policy Advisor to Prime Minister Tony Blair and before that Controller of Corporate Strategy at the BBC. He has also worked in consulting at London Economics Ltd, and as an advisor to Gordon Brown.

References

External links

1965 births
Living people
BBC executives
British media executives
Labour Party (UK) officials
Businesspeople from Portsmouth
Alumni of the London School of Economics
People educated at The Portsmouth Grammar School